Among those who were born in the London Borough of Redbridge, or have dwelt within the borders of the modern borough are (alphabetical order):

 Bernard Ashmole, archaeologist who gives his name to the Ashmolean Museum, Oxford
 Kenny Ball, trumpet playing English jazz musician
 Thomas John Barnardo, social reformer
 Nina Bawden, author
 Raymond Baxter, TV presenter
 Tony Bayfield, rabbi and leader of the Movement for Reform Judaism in the UK
 Nigel Benn, former boxer
 Sidney Bernstein, Baron Bernstein, media entrepreneur
 Jet Black (real name Brian Duffy), drummer with The Stranglers
 John Boardman, classical art historian, "Britain's most distinguished historian of ancient Greek art" 
 Rhian Brewster (born 2000), Sheffield United F.C. footballer
 Geraldine Van Bueren, human rights lawyer
 Ken Campbell, comedian and actor
 Stuart Conquest, chess player
 Michael Coren, columnist, author, public speaker and radio host
 Malcolm Craven, England international speedway rider
 The Dooleys, 1970s pop act
 Noel Edmonds, TV entertainer and presenter
 Julia Fernandez, actress
 Keith Flint (1969–2019), The Prodigy singer
 Bill Fraser, TV actor, The Army Game; ran a sweet shop in Ilford Lane between bookings
 Steven Haberman, actuary and professor
 Georgina Hale, actress
 Jon Hare, computer game designer
 John Carmel Heenan, cardinal and Archbishop of Westminster
 Jane Holland, poet, performer and novelist
 Ian Holm, actor, known as Bilbo Baggins in the Lord of the Rings movie trilogy
 Nasser Hussain, England international cricketer and team captain
 Ronald Hutton, historian, attended Ilford County High School
 Dev Hynes (born 1985), singer and record producer
 Paul Ince, England international footballer
 Frazer Irving, comic book artist
 Jessie J, singer-songwriter, attended Mayfield High School
 Reece James (born 1999), Chelsea F.C. footballer
 Anna Karen (1936-2022), South African born actress who lived in Ilford
Hazel Keech, British-Mauritian actress who predominantly works in Bollywood.
 Mimi Keene, actress
 Kathy Kirby, singer
 Sophie Lawrence, actress
 Jane Leeves, actor, best known as Daphne Moon in Frasier
 Kenneth Lefever, civil servant
 Denise Levertov, poet
 Stephen Lewis, actor who lived in Wanstead Nursing Home until his death in 2015
 Richard Littlejohn, journalist
 Louise Lombard (born 1970), actress
 Frank Miller Lupton (1854–1888), governor of Bahr el Ghazal province, Sudan (1881–1884)
 Raymond Lygo, admiral
 Victor Maddern, actor
 Sean Maguire, singer and actor
 Kevin Maher, footballer
 Tony Minson, virologist and pro-vice-chancellor of the University of Cambridge
 Peter R. Newman, screenwriter
 Geoffrey Orme, screenwriter for television and film
 Tamzin Outhwaite, actress
 Ruth Pitter, poet
 Jenny Powell, TV presenter
 Kathleen Raine, poet and critic
 David Rappaport, actor
 Ruth Rendell (1930–2015), novelist, author of thrillers
 Ian Ridpath, astronomy writer and broadcaster
 Amanda Rosario, British-Indian actress predominantly working in Bollywood
 Fauja Singh, centenarian athletics record holder
 Maggie Smith, actress
 Louise Wener (born 1966), Sleeper singer and author, attended Beal High School near Gants Hill
 Chris Willsher, writer, performer and singer with Bus Station Loonies

References

Redbridge
 samantha falk- overall legend